Rear Admiral Montgomery Sicard (30 September 1836 – 14 September 1900) was an officer in the United States Navy during the American Civil War.

Biography
Born in New York City, Sicard was appointed acting-midshipman on 1 October 1851. After graduation from the Naval Academy he was made midshipman on 9 June 1855. He was then attached to the frigate  (1855–6) and steam frigate ) (1856–9) in the Home Squadron, and was promoted to passed midshipman on 15 April 1858, and to master on 4 November 1858.

Receiving his commission as lieutenant on 31 May 1860, he served aboard the steam sloop  in 1861, and on the steam sloop  of the West Gulf Blockading Squadron in 1862–1863, participating in the capture of New Orleans, Louisiana, late in April 1862; seeing action in the bombardment and passage of Forts Jackson and St. Philip, at the Chalmetto batteries, and in the destruction of rebel flotilla and transports on 24 April 1862, and in the passage of the Vicksburg batteries in June. He was present when the Confederate ram  made an attack on the Union Fleet on 15 July 1862, receiving his commission as lieutenant commander the next day. Sicard commanded the  during the two assaults on Fort Fisher in December 1864 and January 1865, and saw further action at the bombardment of Fort Anderson on 11 February 1865. Sicard then served aboard the steam sloop  on the South Atlantic Blockading Squadron until the war's end.

Sicard was an instructor at the Naval Academy from 1866 to 1868, and commanded the steam sloop  in the North Atlantic Squadron in 1868–1869. He then took command of the steamer  in the Pacific Squadron, and was promoted to commander on 2 March 1870. On 30 October 1870 the Saginaw was wrecked after running aground on Kure Atoll. Arriving at Kauai after 31 days, the boat overturned in the breakers, and only Coxswain William Halford survived. King Kamehameha V sent his steamer Kilauea to rescue the stranded sailors, all of whom survived.

Command duty afloat then alternated with ordnance duty in Washington, D.C., and New York City. Sicard was promoted to the rank of captain on 7 August 1881, and served as chief of the Bureau of Ordnance from 1881 to 1890. He was promoted to commodore on 10 July 1894, to rear admiral on 6 April 1897, taking command of the North Atlantic Squadron. He was forced to relinquish his command at the outbreak of the Spanish–American War due to ill health. Upon his partial recovery, he was placed in charge of the Board of Strategy and took an important part in guiding the conduct of the war.

Sicard was a Companion of the New York Commandery of the Military Order of the Loyal Legion of the United States.

Rear Admiral Sicard retired on 30 September 1898, and died at Westernville, New York, on 14 September 1900.

Namesake
The destroyer  (1920–1945) was named for him. 

Sicard Street, a street inside the Portsmouth Naval Shipyard in Kittery, Maine, is named after him.

The Washington Navy Yard in Washington, D.C., also has a Sicard Street which is named for him.

See also

References

Further reading
 
 

1836 births
1900 deaths
United States Navy admirals
Union Navy officers
People of New York (state) in the American Civil War
United States Naval Academy alumni
People from Westernville, New York
United States Navy personnel of the Spanish–American War
Military personnel from New York City